Stephen Seymour James Andrew (born 9 December 1968), also known as Moli Duru Ambae is an Australian politician. He has been the One Nation member for Mirani in the Queensland Legislative Assembly since 2017.

Andrew describes himself as a "fourth-generation South Sea Islander", and is the first South Sea Islander to be elected to parliament. His great-great-grandmother Lucy Querro of Ambae Island (now part of Vanuatu) was one of the Pacific Islander workers who came to Queensland to work in either the sugarcane fields or domestic service; Andrew claims she was "blackbirded". In July 2019 Andrew became a Vanuatu tribal chieftain, Chief Moli Duru Ambrae, following ceremonies held on Ambae Island.

Before entering parliament he worked as a firearms dealer and pest controller. Andrew is the sole One Nation MP in the Queensland Parliament, but is not the state leader of the party. Ousted MP Steve Dickson held the position until his resignation. The position is currently vacant.

References

External links

1968 births
Living people
Members of the Queensland Legislative Assembly
One Nation members of the Parliament of Queensland
Australian people of Vanuatuan descent
Pauline Hanson's One Nation politicians
21st-century Australian politicians